The 2012 Mountain West Conference baseball tournament took place from May 24 through 26.  The top four regular season finishers of the league's five teams met in the double-elimination tournament held at University of Nevada, Las Vegas's Earl Wilson Stadium.  New Mexico won their second Mountain West Conference Baseball Championship by a score of 22–3 and earned the conference's automatic bid to the 2012 NCAA Division I baseball tournament.

Seeding

The top four finishers from the home and home, round robin regular season will be seeded one through four.

Results

References

Tournament
Mountain West Conference baseball tournament
Mountain West Conference baseball tournament
Mountain West Conference baseball tournament
College baseball tournaments in Nevada
Sports competitions in the Las Vegas Valley